El Oro may refer to several places:
El Oro Province, Ecuador
El Oro Municipality, Mexico State, Mexico
El Oro Municipality, Durango, Mexico
El Oro District, Antabamba, Peru

See also
Oro (disambiguation)